Murphy James Foster Jr. (July 11, 1930 – October 4, 2020) was an American businessman and politician who served as the 53rd governor of Louisiana from 1996 to 2004.

Early life and career

Murphy James Foster Jr. was born in Franklin, the seat of government of St. Mary Parish. His father, also named Murphy James Foster, was an area sugar planter and owner of oil and natural gas lands, whose own father was Murphy J. Foster Sr., who was Louisiana governor from 1892 to 1900 and a U.S. Senator from 1901 to 1913. As governor, Murphy Foster led the campaign to disenfranchise Black citizens through the Louisiana Constitution of 1898, calling for an end to "the leprous virus of negro suffrage, thereby creating a running sore which has ever since tainted our government, both federal and state, with foul corruption and loathsome disease."

Mike Foster's mother, Olive Roberts (1904-1990), was descended from a prominent family in Minden in Webster Parish and Shreveport in Caddo Parish in northwestern Louisiana. Foster's maternal great-grandfather, Alfred Goodwill (1830-1905), was a native of England and a captain in the Confederate Army. One of the three children of Captain Goodwill and his second wife Ida, was Olive Goodwill (born circa 1875). She married Robert Roberts Jr., a former mayor of both Farmerville in Union Parish and Minden, a state representative for Webster Parish, a state district court judge, and an attorney in private practice in Shreveport. Their daughter married Foster's father. One of Foster's cousins, Jasper Goodwill, was the mayor of Minden from 1955 to 1958.

Foster attended public high school in Franklin, graduated from Louisiana State University in Baton Rouge in 1952 with a Bachelor of Science in chemistry, and Southern University Law Center with a Juris Doctor in 2004, the year he left the governorship. He became an Eagle Scout in the Boy Scouts of America in 1946 and was a recipient of the Distinguished Eagle Scout Award. He was a member of Delta Kappa Epsilon fraternity (Zeta Zeta chapter) and The Friars.  He joined the Air Force and served in the Korean War. By the time Mike Foster entered politics, he had already become a wealthy sugar planter and owner of a construction firm.  He resided at Oaklawn Manor, an antebellum plantation mansion in Franklin.

Foster entered politics at the age of 57. In 1987, then-Democrat Foster unseated liberal Democratic state Senator Anthony Guarisco Jr. of Morgan City by a large margin. Foster was said to have run for the state Senate because Guarisco would not return his telephone calls. Guarisco was a vocal supporter of the defunct Equal Rights Amendment.  Foster served two terms in the state Senate and then ran for governor.

Election as governor, 1995

Foster entered the 1995 gubernatorial race as a minor candidate whom most local political observers discounted. Then in September 1995, Foster announced he would qualify for the race as a Republican.  The Republicans had not coalesced on a candidate, and Foster's announcement that he was switching parties vaulted him from single digits in the polls to serious contention.  Foster rode a wave of popular dissatisfaction with the more unsavory aspects of the casino gambling that had been legalized under outgoing Governor Edwin W. Edwards.  Foster came out strongly against gambling and pledged to run Louisiana "like a business."   His conservative platform included attacks on welfare abuse, gun control, affirmative action, racial quotas, and political corruption.

He carried the endorsement of the columnist and former Republican presidential candidate Patrick J. Buchanan.

Foster edged out two more well-known candidates for a seat in the runoff with then-United States Representative Cleo Fields from Louisiana's 4th congressional district, a prominent black Democratic politician.  Future U.S. Senator Mary Landrieu ran third and missed the general election berth by just 8,983 votes (0.6 percent of the total votes cast). Former Governor Buddy Roemer, seeking a gubernatorial comeback, came in fourth place.  Foster's embrace of the Republican label and his conservative platform undercut Roemer, another Democrat-turned-Republican.

Reminiscent of his grandfather's inauguration virtually a century earlier, Mike Foster's inauguration ceremony on January 8, 1996, occurred at the Old State Capitol. Always a man of few words, Foster remarked briefly about the historicity of the occasion and made cordial statements about outgoing four-term Governor Edwin Edwards, who was present.

Foster defeated black Democratic candidates in both of his campaigns for governor—Cleo Fields in 1995 and Congressman William Jefferson of Louisiana's 2nd congressional district in 1999. He defeated Jefferson in a landslide, avoiding a runoff with 64 percent of the vote. His second inauguration took place on January 10, 2000.

Foster as governor

Foster was widely seen as having favored business to a greater degree than had previous governors. He retained the secretary of economic development, former legislator Kevin P. Reilly Sr. of Baton Rouge, the former CEO of Lamar Advertising Company of Baton Rouge. He ended state affirmative action and set-aside programs, which earned him the support of the business community but prompted protests from civil rights groups. Foster also targeted tort reform and ended the practice by which trial lawyers could seek punitive damages from businesses. Foster had close relations with the statewide pro-business lobbying group Louisiana Association of Business and Industry (LABI) for most of his tenure, though there were short-lived tensions in 2000 over Foster's attempt to raise business taxes in an effort to secure funding for higher education. By the end of his second term, Foster was receiving criticism for his reluctance to take business trips in order to attract businesses and jobs to Louisiana, and for enrolling in part-time law school classes while still in office. He also appointed then 24-year-old Bobby Jindal, later a two-term Republican governor, as head of the Louisiana Department of Health and Hospitals.

As his executive counsel, Foster appointed the Democrat Cheney Joseph Jr. (1942–2015), a member of the LSU Law School faculty and a former district attorney for East Baton Rouge Parish.

Foster appointed former state Representative Terry W. Gee of New Orleans as the executive director of the Louisiana Offshore Port Authority, or LOOP. Gee remained in the post for the entire Foster administration and worked to guarantee port security in light of the threat of terrorism. Foster appointed education reformer and attorney Paul Pastorek to the Louisiana Board of Elementary and Secondary Education; Pastorek was thereafter from 2007 to 2011 the state superintendent of education. In 2000, Foster named Terry Landry, a veteran African-American officer, as the superintendent of the Louisiana State Police. In 2012, Landry was elected to the Louisiana House of Representatives for Lafayette, Iberia, and St. Martin parishes.

Foster named Democrat former state Representative Randy Roach to head a task force on transportation infrastructure and economic development. Thereafter, Roach was elected mayor of Lake Charles. In 1996, Foster appointed Bo Ackal, a state representative from New Iberia as his assistant on budgeting and taxation.
 
Foster worked to re-organize the state's community college system by creating the Louisiana Community and Technical College System, and expanded the Tuition Opportunity Program for Students (TOPS), a brainchild of the New Orleans oilman Patrick F. Taylor, so that students were eligible based on merit, rather than income. In the 2002 legislative session, Foster credited freshman Representative Tom Capella of Jefferson Parish, now the parish assessor, with saving TOPS from the budget axe. Foster instituted mandatory standardized testing for grade advancement in a move described by his administration as an effort to make public schools more accountable. He made increasing teacher salaries a major priority, at one point promising to stop cashing his paychecks until teachers' salaries reached the Southern average. Andy Kopplin served as Governor Foster's chief of staff.

He retained long-term political operative Aubrey W. Young, originally the aide de camp to Governor John J. McKeithen, as the drug and alcohol counselor in the Department of Health and Hospitals.

In 1997, Foster named former state budget director Ralph Perlman as secretary of the Louisiana Gaming Control Board, a position that Perlman held for five years while in his eighties.

The two Speakers of the House under Foster's administration were Democrat (later Republican) Hunt Downer of Terrebonne Parish and Charles W. DeWitt Jr., a Democrat from Rapides Parish. In Louisiana, the governor practically handpicks the Speaker despite the separation of powers. Foster also relied heavily on Republican State Representative Chuck McMains of Baton Rouge as a legislative floor leader for the administration. He named Republican Representative Garey Forster of New Orleans as his state labor secretary.

Known for going to bed early, Foster still managed to adjust to evening classes he took while Governor at the Southern University Law Center.

An avid motorcycling enthusiast, Foster introduced an initiative while governor to remove a legal mandate that required motorcyclists to wear helmets when they ride on the highways. This initiative was later overturned by his successor, Democratic Governor Kathleen Babineaux Blanco.

In 2000, Foster was the Louisiana campaign chairman for the Bush-Cheney ticket.

Despite having run on an anti-gambling platform, in office Foster became a quiet supporter of the gambling industry.  His advocacy of a bailout bill for the Harrah's casino in New Orleans helped ensure the passage of the measure. Prior to leaving office, Foster quarreled with fellow Republican Representative David Vitter over expanded gambling on Indian reservations. The dispute did not prevent Vitter from winning the U.S. Senate seat from Louisiana vacated by Democrat John Breaux in 2004.

Atchafalaya Basin Program

In November 1996 the U.S. Army Corps of Engineers requested that Foster appoint a lead agency to coordinate state participation in the Atchafalaya Basin Project. Foster chose the Louisiana Department of Natural Resources as the lead agency. Sandra Thompson, a highly regarded state administrator from the 1970s, was called back to state government to head the project, an important position in the preservation of the environment. In December 1996, the Atchafalaya Basin Advisory Committee was created, members appointed, and planning initiated that resulted in the Atchafalaya Basin Master Plan, as authorized by the U.S. Congress. A result of this plan was the creation of the Sherburne Complex Wildlife Management Area (Section 4.41-B) that includes the partnership of the U.S. Fish and Wildlife Service, the Louisiana Department of Wildlife and Fisheries (LDWF), and the U.S. Army Corps of Engineers.

Foster and David Duke

In his 1995 campaign, Foster paid more than $150,000 for former Ku Klux Klansman David Duke's mailing list of supporters. After failing to report the purchase as a campaign expenditure, Foster became the first Louisiana governor to admit and pay a fine for a violation of the state's ethics code. Foster insisted that he did not need to report the expenditure because he paid Duke with his personal funds and did not utilize the list in his campaign. Duke also endorsed Foster in the 1995 campaign.

Foster initially seemed to favor Duke's run for the Senate seat being vacated in 1996 by J. Bennett Johnston Jr., but under pressure from the Republican Party, he did not officially endorse Duke. Instead, the Republican consensus choice for the Senate was veteran state Representative Louis E. "Woody" Jenkins of Baton Rouge. Jenkins was narrowly defeated by Johnston's choice, Mary Landrieu.

Foster and Dan Richey

In 1997, Foster named former state Senator Dan Richey, to head the new Governor's Program on Abstinence. The appointment became controversial in 2002, when the American Civil Liberties Union sued the state on grounds that Richey had permitted religious instruction to be used in the program in violation of federal law. Foster and Richey went to court to defend the program and pledged that violations cited by the ACLU had been remedied. The program is underwritten by the National welfare reform law of 1996.

Post governorship

In retirement, Foster lived with his wife Alice C. Foster (born 1940), to whom he was married for over 50 years, on the family estate near Franklin. She is active in the Sunshine Foundation in Baton Rouge, which seeks to enhance self-esteem among Louisiana public school youngsters.

In 2003, Foster was inducted into the Louisiana Political Museum and Hall of Fame in Winnfield.

In 2013, the state agreed to fund $2 million to renovate part of Franklin City Hall to provide housing for Foster's papers.

On September 28, 2020, news reports confirmed Foster entered hospice care.

After spending a week in hospice care, Mike Foster died on October 4, 2020, at the age of 90.

Electoral history

State Senator, 21st Senatorial District, 1987

Threshold > 50%

First Ballot, October 24, 1987

State Senator, 21st Senatorial District, 1991

Threshold > 50%

First Ballot, October 19, 1991

Governor of Louisiana, 1995

Threshold > 50%

First Ballot, October 21, 1995

Second Ballot, November 18, 1995

Governor of Louisiana, 1999

Threshold > 50%

First Ballot, October 23, 1999

Sources 
State of Louisiana – Biography
DuBos, Clancy.  "Foster on Fire."  Gambit Weekly.  October 3, 1995.
Kurtz, David.  "Mike's Millions:  He may be a working man, but Mike Foster certainly doesn't have to."  New Orleans Magazine, May 1996.
Reeves, Miriam.  The Governors of Louisiana.  Gretna: Pelican Publishing, 1998.
Warner, Chris.  "Mike Foster's Legacy: What Will it Be?" State Business Louisiana. Winter 2002.
Governor Murphy J. "Mike" Foster Jr.

Videos
(1) Foster's Inauguration as Louisiana's 53rd Governor on January 8, 1996, at the Old State Capitol Grounds 

(2) Second Inauguration on the State Capitol Grounds on January 10, 2000 

(3) State of the State Address on April 29, 1996 

(4) Joint Session of the Louisiana State Legislature from May 30, 1996 

(5) Opening Address to the Louisiana State Legislature on March 31, 1997 

(6) Special Session of the Louisiana State Legislature from March 23, 1998 

(7) Opening Address to Fiscal Session of the Louisiana State Legislature from April 27, 1998 

(8) Opening Address to the Louisiana State Legislature from March 29, 1999 

(9) Gubernatorial Debate Forum from October 8, 1999 

(10) Opening Address to the Louisiana State Legislature from March 19, 2000 

(11) Fiscal Session from April 24, 2000 

(12) Special Session from March 11, 2001 

(13) Opening Address to the Louisiana State Legislature from March 26, 2001 

(14) Press conference on the September 11th terrorist attacks on September 12, 2001 

(15) Opening Address to the Louisiana State Legislature from April 29, 2002 

(16) Final State of the State Address from March 31, 2003

References

External links

|-

|-

1930 births
2020 deaths
20th-century American Episcopalians
21st-century American Episcopalians
Episcopalians from Louisiana
Businesspeople from Louisiana
Louisiana lawyers
Republican Party governors of Louisiana
Republican Party Louisiana state senators
Louisiana State University alumni
Military personnel from Louisiana
Politicians from Baton Rouge, Louisiana
People from Franklin, Louisiana
Southern University Law Center alumni